Athol Laverick Murray (1930–2018) was a historian and archivist.

He was the son of George Murray, a bank manager, and Margery Laverick.

He studied at Cambridge and gained his PhD at the University of Edinburgh in 1961 on the records of the Scottish exchequer. He was briefly a teacher at the Sebright School in Worcestershire. He joined the Scottish Record Office, now National Records of Scotland, as an Assistant Keeper, in 1953. He became Keeper of Records in 1985.

The historian Julian Goodare noted that Athol Murray had carefully explained the story of John Acheson, a Scottish goldsmith and mining entrepreneur.

Publications
 The Royal Grammar School Lancaster: A History (W. Heffer, 1951).
 Sebright school, Wolverley: A History (W. Heffer, 1953).
 'The Procedure of the Scottish Exchequer in the Early Sixteenth Century', Scottish Historical Review, 40:130 part 2 (October 1961), pp. 89-117.
 'Pursemaster's Accounts', Miscellany of the Scottish History Society, X (Edinburgh, 1965).
 'Sir John Skene and the exchequer, 1594-1612', Stair Society Miscellany, vol. 1 (Edinburgh, 1971).
 'Financing the Royal Household: James V and his Comptrollers', Renaissance and Reformation in Scotland (Scottish Academic Press, Edinburgh, 1983), pp. 42–59.
 'Exchequer, Council and Session, 1513-1542', Janet Hadley Williams, Stewart Style (East Linton: Tuckwell, 1996), pp. 97-117
 'The monuments of a family: A collection of jewels associated with Elizabeth of Bohemia', PSAS, 131 (2002), pp. 327-348

References

1930 births
2018 deaths
20th-century Scottish historians
Monarchy and money